Madonna and Child with Saint Mary Magdalene and Saint Ursula or Virgin and Child with Saints Magdalene and Ursula is an oil on panel painting by Giovanni Bellini that belongs to the sacra conversazione genre and dates to 1490. The painting is also referred to as Sacred Conversation. It was previously in the collection of the painter Carlo Maratta, and is now in the Prado Museum in Madrid.

It is very similar to the same artist's Madonna and Child with Saint Catherine and Saint Mary Magdalene in the Gallerie dell'Accademia; they both formed part of a group of paintings which show the popularity of the genre, with several replicas, mostly from Bellini's studio or only partly by his own hand, including those in Urbino and the Pierrepont Morgan Library in New York. The Madrid example shows saint Mary Magdalene and saint Ursula.

References

Paintings of the Madonna and Child by Giovanni Bellini
Paintings of the Museo del Prado by Italian artists
1490 paintings
Paintings of Saint Ursula
Paintings depicting Mary Magdalene